Lyes Derriche ((born 1928 in Casbah of Algiers, Algiers, Algeria; died 2001 in El Madania, Algeria) was an Algerian  politician.

Algerian War 
Lyès Deriche, the son of Mouhamed Deriche, housed in his villa in the Algerian commune of Clos-Salembier the meeting of the Group of 22 baptized Revolutionary Committee of Unity and Action (RCUA).

On 25 July 1954, in the modest villa belonging to Lyès Deriche, twenty-two Algerians spoke for the unlimited revolution until total independence. They were all elders of the Special Organization who were summoned in the second half of June 1954.

Many of them were from families where there were qaids and bachaghas who had studied in the schools of the Association Of Algerian Muslim scholars.

Lyès Deriche, a friend of Zoubir Bouadjadj, was a former militant of the Movement for the Triumph of Democratic Liberties. He welcomed Mohamed Boudiaf who was the revolutionary leader of Algiers, and had prepared the meal for the participants in the historic meeting.

About noon the owner of the house, Deriche, invited the presents to a couscous, and after a short pause they returned to work.

See also 

 List of Algerians
 History of Algeria
 Algerian nationalism
 Algerian National Movement
 French Third Republic
 French Fourth Republic

References

External links
 Website "www.thenia.net" about Thénia
 First Website "http://menerville.free.fr" about "Ménerville and Thénia" before 1962
 Second Website "http://menerville2.free.fr" about "Ménerville and Thénia" before 1962

1932 births
People from Souk El-Had
People from Thénia District
People from Boumerdès Province
Kabyle people
1982 deaths
Burials in Algeria
20th-century Algerian politicians
Algerian Berber politicians
Algerian nationalism